The 1930 Frankford Yellow Jackets season was their seventh in the National Football League. The team failed to improve on their previous league record of 9–4–5, winning only four league games. They lost all eight games they played in October and finished ninth in the league standings.

Roster
Nate Barragar
Bull Behman
Eddie Bollinger
Tom Capps
Clyde Crabtree
Wally Diehl
Jack Ernst
George Gibson
Royce Goodbread
Eddie Halicki
Hal Hanson
Charlie Havens
Henry Homan
Jack Hutton
Herb Joesting
Tom Jones
Tony Kostos
Harvey Long
Jerry Lunz
Roger Mahoney
Jack McArthur
Mally Nydahl
Tony Panaccion
Jim Pederson
Art Pharmer
Neil Rengel
Ray Richards
Kelly Rodriguez	
Herman Seborg
Johnny Shultz
Gene Smith
Tony Steponovich
Cookie Tackwell
Bob Tanner
Clyde Van Sickle
Johnny Ward
Gordon Watkins
Lee Wilson
Ab Wright

Schedule

Standings

References

Frankford Yellow Jackets seasons
Frankford Yellow Jackets